Tekeste Mitiku (born 9 November 1961) is an Ethiopian racewalker. He competed in the men's 20 kilometres walk at the 1980 Summer Olympics.

References

1961 births
Living people
Athletes (track and field) at the 1980 Summer Olympics
Ethiopian male racewalkers
Olympic athletes of Ethiopia
Place of birth missing (living people)